The Seventh Continent or 7th Continent can refer to:

 The Seventh Continent (1966 film), a 1966 Croatian film
 The Seventh Continent (1989 film), a 1989 Austrian film
 Sedmoi Kontinent, a grocery retail chain in Russia
 The 7th Continent, a 2017 board game

See also
 Antarctica: The Battle for the Seventh Continent, a 2016 book by Doaa Abdel-Motaal